Saint George Killing the Dragon, also known as Saint George and the Dragon is a tempera painting by the Spanish artist Bernat Martorell, painted . It depicts the famous legend of St. George and the Dragon in which the Christian knight, St. George, rescues a princess from a dragon.

History
The painting was likely commissioned by the Catalonian government as an altarpiece for the Chapel of St. George, in the Government Palace of Catalonia in Barcelona. The four side-panels that would likely have also been fixed to the altar, depict the martyrdom of St. George, and are currently on display in the Louvre Museum in Paris. The painting was most probably painted some time between 1434 and 1435.

Starting in 1867, the painting changed hands numerous times until it was eventually sold to Charles Deering in 1917. In 1921, the painting was loaned to the Art Institute of Chicago by Deering. Then, in 1924, the painting went to Deering's daughters, Marion Deering-McCormick and Barbara Deering-Danielson, who donated the work to the Art Institute of Chicago in 1933.

Description
The work, painted in International Gothic style, depicts Saint George's legend in the setting of Catalonia, Spain, during the first half of the 15th century. The painting was initially made as the centerpiece of an altar, and was surrounded by four, smaller, narrative panels.

The scene in the foreground shows St. George on a stark white horse, about to defeat the dragon by stabbing it with his lance. St. George is depicted in black armor with a halo above his head. The saint's expression appears calm and stoic in contrast to the dragon's, which seems angry and excited. The dragon has dark-green scales, is winged, and has red eyes. The dragon's scales, and the armor and halo on St. George are decorated with raised stucco. The ground is shown to be littered with lizards, skulls, and other bones.
In the immediate background, the princess stands praying behind them; she is dressed in a pink robe lined with ermine fur, with a large golden crown above her red-golden hair. In the distance, on the other side of a valley, the princess' parents and common people can be seen to be watching apprehensively from atop a castle. The castle is surrounded by a serene and intricate countryside.

In the style typical of International Gothic works, the ground rises steeply behind the scene but, unusually, it does not stretch behind the entire painting. Rather, there is a clear separation between the foreground and the background. While the background maintains the decorative nature and continuity of color typical of International Gothic backgrounds, the foreground is more expressive, and contains gradations of color and lighting.

The main axis of the composition can be placed by the shaft of St. George's lance and an imaginary vertical line drawn through the eyes of the dragon, the horse, and the princess. The two lines create a "V" shape that outlines the castle in the background.

Further reading

 Marcel Dieulafoy, Art in Spain and Portugal, London, 1913, p. 175, fig. 347.
 “An Altar Panel by Benito Martorell,” International Studio 76, 305 (1922), p. 59.
 R[obert] B. H[arshe], “Saint George Combating the Dragon,” Bulletin of the Art Institute of Chicago 16 (1922), pp. 18–21 (cover ill.).
 Georgiana Goddard King, “The Rider on the White Horse,” Art Bulletin 5 (1922), p. 6, fig. 10.
 The Art Institute of Chicago, A Guide to the Paintings in the Permanent Collection, 1925, p. 169, no. 2289.
 Paula Pope Miller, review of Roosval, Nya Sankt Gorans Studier, in Art Bulletin 9 (1926–27), pp. 163–64, figs. 1, 3, 4.
 August L. Mayer, Historia de la pintura española, Madrid, 1928, p. 47; 2nd ed., 1942, p. 98.
 Gabriel Rouchès, La Peinture espagnole: Le Moyen Âge, Paris, 1929, pp. 65, 138–40.
 Walter Dill Scott and Robert B. Harshe, Charles Deering, 1852–1927: An Appreciation, Boston, 1929, p. 51 (ill. opp. p. 50).
 Chandler Rathfon Post, A History of Spanish Painting, vol. 2, Cambridge, Mass., 1930, pp. 393–98, 414–15, 424, 442, fig. 223.
 George Harold Edgell, A History of Sienese Painting, New York, 1932, pp. 107–8, fig. 115.
 B[enjamin] Rowland, Jaume Huguet, Cambridge, Mass., 1932, p. 23.
 Art Institute of Chicago, Annual Report, 1933, p. 34.
 Jane M. Wilson, “Once in a Lifetime: The Art of Five Centuries and a Dozen Schools under One Roof,” Delphian Quarterly 16 (1933), pp. 3–4.
 The Art Institute of Chicago, A Brief Illustrated Guide to the Collections, 1935, p. 24 (ill.).
 Chandler Rathfon Post, A History of Spanish Painting, vol. 7, Cambridge, Mass., 1938, pp. 60, 120, 204–05, 669.
 F[rank] J[ewett] Mather, Western European Painting of the Renaissance, New York, 1939, p. 222, fig. 128.
 Hans Tietze, Meisterwerke europäische Malerei in Amerika, Vienna, 1935, p. 307, pl. 9 (Eng. ed., Masterpieces of European Painting in America, New York, 1939).
 The Art Institute of Chicago, A Brief Illustrated Guide to the Collections, 1941, p. 30.
 José Gudiol, ed., Spanish Painting, exh. cat., Toledo Museum of Art, 1941, p. 24, fig. 16.
 Chandler Rathfon Post, A History of Spanish Painting, vol. 8, Cambridge, Mass., 1941, pp. 618, 622, 624, 628.
 Regina Shoolman and Charles E. Slatkin, !e Enjoyment of Art in America, Philadelphia and New York, 1942, p. 463, pl. 404.
 Oskar Hagen, Patterns and Principles of Spanish Art, rev. ed., Madison, Wis., 1943, pp. 113–15, fig. 39.
 The Art Institute of Chicago, An Illustrated Guide to the Collections of The Art Institute of Chicago, 1945, p. 32 (ill.).
 The Art Institute of Chicago, A Picture Book: Masterpieces of Painting, XV and XVI Centuries in the Collections of The Art Institute of Chicago, 1946, pp. 2–5.
 The Art Institute of Chicago, An Illustrated Guide to the Collections of The Art Institute of Chicago, 1948, p. 28 (ill.).
 Everard M. Upjohn, Paul S. Wingert, and Jane Gaston Mahler, History of World Art, New York, 1949, pp. 166–67, fig. 172.
 Stephen V. Grancsay, “The Interrelationships of Costume and Armor,” Metropolitan Museum of Art Bulletin 8 (1950), p. 181 (ill.).
 Jacques Lassaigne, Spanish Painting from the Catalan Frescos to El Greco, trans. Stuart Gilbert, Geneva, 1952, p. 129.
 “Chicago’s Fabulous Collectors: Art Institute Announces it will Get Treasures from their Homes,” Life Magazine (October 27, 1952): 91 (ill).
 The Art Institute of Chicago, An Illustrated Guide to the Collections of The Art Institute of Chicago, 1956, pp. 28–29 (ill.).
 Chandler Rathfon Post, A History of Spanish Painting, vol. 12, Cambridge, Mass., 1958, p. 249.
 Stora Spanska Mästare, exh. cat., Stockholm, Nationalmuseum, 1959, p. 41.
 The Art Institute of Chicago, Paintings in The Art Institute of Chicago: A Catalogue of the Picture Collection, 1961, pp. 95 (ill.), 296.
 Renzo Chiarelli, Margherita Lenzini Moriondo, and Franco Mazzini, European Painting in the 15th Century, New York, 1961, pp. 19, 222.
 José Gudiol, The Arts of Spain, Garden City, N.Y., 1964, p. 153.
 Eric Young, “Medieval Painting in Spain: Progress and Problems,” Apollo 79 (1964), p. 12, fig. 2.
 Frederick A. Sweet, “Great Chicago Collectors,” Apollo 84 (1966), p. 204, 207, fig. 41.
 J[osé] M[anuel] Pita Andrade, Treasures of Spain, trans. Isabel Quigly, vol. 1, Geneva, 1967, p. 193.
 John Maxon, The Art Institute of Chicago, London, 1970, pp. 27–28.
 Marian Burleigh, “The ‘Triumph of Death’ in Palermo,” Marsyas: Studies in the History of Art 15 (1970–71), pp. 54–55, pl. 22, fig. 15.
 Art Institute of Chicago, 100 Masterpieces, 1978, p. 40, no. 3 (ill.).
 Mary Faith Mitchell Grizzard, “Bernardo Martorell: Fifteenth-Century Catalan Artist,” Ph.D. diss., University of Michigan, 1978 (New York and London, 1985), pp. 185–201, 445–46, figs. 11, 19.
 Mary Grizzard, “An Identification of Martorell’s Commission for the Aragonese Corts,” Art Bulletin 64 (1982), pp. 312–13, fig. 3.
 Art Institute of Chicago, Master Paintings in The Art Institute of Chicago, 1988, p. 13 (ill.).
 Judith Berg Sobré, Behind the Altar Table: The Development of the Painted Retable in Spain, 1350–1500, Columbia, Mo., 1989, p. 91, fig. 48.
 Joan Ainaud de Lasarte, Catalan Painting, vol. 2, New York, 1990, pp. 78–80.
 Santiago Alcolea Blanch, “Martorell, Bernat,” in Dictionary of Art, vol. 20, 1996, p. 514, fig. 1.
 Audrey Niffenegger, The Time Traveler's Wife, New York, 2003, pp. 48–49.
 M[artha] W[olff], in Art Institute of Chicago Museum Studies 30, 2 (2004), pp. 79–80, no. 54 (cover ill.).
 Larry J. Feinberg, “A Brief History of the Old Masters in the Art Institute of Chicago,” Art Institute of Chicago Museum Studies 32, 2 (2006), p. 12, fig. 6.
 Judith Berg Sobré in Martha Wolff et al., Northern European and Spanish Paintings before 1600 in the Art Institute of Chicago, Chicago, 2008, pp. 78–86, ill.
 Justin E.A. Kroesen, Staging the Liturgy: The Medieval Altarpiece in the Iberian Peninsula, Leuven, Paris and Walpole, Massachusetts, 2009, pp. 82–83, fig. 58.

References

External links
 

1430s paintings
Spanish paintings
Paintings in the collection of the Art Institute of Chicago
Paintings of Saint George (martyr)
Saint George and the Dragon
Paintings of dragons
Religious paintings
Gothic paintings
Women in art
Horses in art
Altarpieces